Devasthana and devasthanam are terms referring to Hindu temples.

The terms may also refer to:
Devasathan, the main Hindu temple in Thailand
Devasthanam (film), a 2012 Telugu film